Gozzadini is a surname.  Notable people with the surname include:

 Bettisia Gozzadini, Italian jurist
 Giovanni Gozzadini, Italian historian
 Marcantonio Gozzadini, Italian cardinal, cousin of Pope Gregory XV (1574–1623)
 , Italian notary (fl. 1295–1329)
 Ulisse Gozzadini, Italian cardinal and bishop of Imola (1650–1728)

Italian-language surnames